Len Beavis is a former association football player who represented New Zealand at international level.

Beavis made a single appearance in an official international for New Zealand in a 5–6 loss to South Africa on 28 June 1947.

References 

Year of birth missing (living people)
Living people
New Zealand association footballers
New Zealand international footballers
Association footballers not categorized by position